The St. Thomas SyroMalabar Forane Catholic Church, Philadelphia is a Syro-Malabar Catholic Parish located in Philadelphia, Pennsylvania. It is one of the 9 Forane Churches for the St. Thomas Syro-Malabar Catholic Eparchy of Chicago.

History 
When the United States passed, the Immigration and Nationality Act of 1965. Many Indians moved from Kerala, India to the city of Philadelphia. In 1977, Around 100 families in the Philadelphia area established The Indian Catholic Association that celebrated Syro Malabar rite Qurbana or Mass to the people of Philadelphia. 

In 1983, after consultation with the Syro Malabar Synod, Roman Catholic Archdiocese of Philadelphia established the Indian Catholic Mission to serve the Syro Malabar Community. 

In 2001, Pope John Paul II established the Syro Malabar Eparchy of Chicago to serve Syro Malabar Catholics all over the United States with Rev Fr. Jacob Angadiath of Dallas selected as its first Eparch which then the Indian Catholic Mission then belonged to. Mar Jacob selected Rev. Fr. Jacob Christy Parambukattil to serve as the first mission director of the newly Syro Malabar Eparchy of Chicago led Mission. 

On January 19, 2005, The Mission led by Fr. Jacob Christy bought a Synagogue facility from Temple Beth Torah. The Church was dedicated on January 31 of that year but after renovations was it officially became a Parish of the Syro Malabar Church Eparchy on March 19, 2005, for St. Joseph's Feast.

Forane Church 
On April 2014, Mar Jacob Angadiath announced that the Philadelphia Parish would be elevated to a Forane Church, one of the 9 due to the eparchy's geographical vastness and for better co-ordination. 

There are 9 Syro Malabar Churches and Missions under the St. Thomas, Philadelphia Forane.

Vicars 
The Church is currently led by Reverend Fr. Kuriakose Kumbakeel who led Syro Malabar Churches in Coral Springs and Los Angeles prior to his service in Philadelphia

See also 

 Syro-Malabar Church
 Syro-Malabar Catholic Eparchy of St. Thomas of Chicago

References 

Catholic churches in the United States
2005 establishments in Pennsylvania